"Shot at the Night" is a song by American rock band The Killers. The song serves as the lead single from the band's second compilation album, Direct Hits. The track was unveiled on September 16, 2013, the 10th anniversary of the band's first London show, and sent immediately to mainstream radio.

Recording and production
The song was produced by M83's Anthony Gonzalez, who had supported the band on their Day & Age World Tour. Island Records subsequently suggested Gonzalez as a possible producer for the band, following the success of M83's sixth studio album, Hurry Up, We're Dreaming (2011). Guitarist Dave Keuning noted, "There was a mutual thing like, 'Yeah we think he's good. We'll try him out.' It's something we finally agreed with our label on."

Regarding the band's collaboration with Gonzalez, vocalist Brandon Flowers stated, "He's one of these new school producers. He's a technical wizard, but you can't discount his musicality. A lot of people do, because of the involvement of computers, but he's a real musician, too. He and Stuart Price may be known for working on the digital side of things, but they're also two of the most musical guys I've ever met."

Critical reception
The song has received positive reviews from music critics. NME listed it top of their "10 tracks you have to hear this week 18/09/13", noting "it's a fittingly triumphant mix of Gonzalez's glittering synth-pop and The Killers' own huge-hearted bombast", adding "it has a euphoric chorus that's as reminiscent of '80s power-pop as the anthemic indie that Nevada's finest have become renowned for." 

Spin found the track to be a "space-age jewel — with its sparkling electronics, chest-thumping chorus, and Midnight City-reared percussion". 

Rolling Stone believed the song ventures into "the fantasia of Eighties pop-rock soundtracks, dripping with hair spray, swaddled in the fog of dry ice", and concluded the song was "solid", and later listed "Shot at the Night" as the hundredth best song of the year.

Music video
The music video for the song was unveiled on September 26, 2013, and was directed by Roboshobo, who had previously worked with the band on Christmas charity singles 'The Cowboy's Christmas Ball' and 'I Feel It In My Bones'. Regarding the choice of director, lead singer Brandon Flowers noted "We always get a ton of treatments for videos where raunchiness and debauchery are at the forefront, regardless of what fire the song is stoking. We liked that Robert's treatment was different and classy, and he pulled it off."

The video features Dark Shadows actress Bella Heathcote, and The Social Network star Max Minghella. Heathcote portrays a working class hotel maid at the Cosmopolitan Hotel in Las Vegas, clearly unsatisfied with her mundane lifestyle, matching the song's melancholic lyrical yearning "Give me a shot at the night...". She accidentally encounters a handsome hotel guest, portrayed by Minghella, and his friends. The two form an instant connection, leading Heathcote's character to abandon her shift and explore Vegas by night with her new found love interest, thus getting her very own "shot at the night".

According to the Nevada Film Commission, the young woman is shown working at the Cosmopolitan Hotel & Casino. The video features famous Las Vegas landmarks such as Treasure Island, The Stratosphere, The Cosmopolitan, Luxor, Caesars, and Downtown Las Vegas." Other locations include A Little White Wedding Chapel and Flamingo Las Vegas.

The Las Vegas Review Journal ranked it as the #2 Best Music Video Filmed in Las Vegas."

Live performances
The Killers performed the song live for the first time at the Life Is Beautiful Festival in Las Vegas, Nevada.
The Killers performed the song live on Later... with Jools Holland on November 5, 2013, Jimmy Kimmel Live on November 12, and Ellen on November 15.  They also performed the song live at the MTV Europe Music Awards on November 11, and on BBC Maida Vale Studio 4 on November 7.

NCAA March Madness theme
In 2014, the song was chosen as the 'musical backdrop' for CBS Sports and Turner Sports' TV coverage of the NCAA March Madness basketball tournament. A special video was shot by the band at the Skywalk overlooking the Grand Canyon, with the video being shown in various lengths throughout the tournament.

Charts

Accolades

References

2013 singles
The Killers songs
2013 songs
Island Records singles
Songs written by Brandon Flowers